The NWA Southern Women's Championship was a women's professional wrestling championship created in 1937.  After 1944 it was defended in the National Wrestling Alliance affiliated Georgia Championship Wrestling (then known as ABC Booking) until the championship was retired in 1970.

Title history
[…] Means champion lineage is uncertain at this period in time
Key

See also
Jim Crockett Promotions
National Wrestling Alliance
Georgia Championship Wrestling

References

External links
NWA Women's Southern Title
Georgia Wrestling History

Georgia Championship Wrestling championships
National Wrestling Alliance championships
Professional wrestling in Georgia (U.S. state)
Regional professional wrestling championships
Women's professional wrestling championships